Without Zero is the third studio album by English dance music group Joi, released on 19 January 2007 by Real World Records.

Critical response

Louis Patterson of BBC Music rated Without Zero 3.5/5 and called it "A spirited, experimentally minded soundclash that's as fun as it is inspired." Stewart Mason of AllMusic rated the album 3.5/5 and said, "...there's nothing here that will change the mind of anyone thus far resistant to Shamsher's cross-cultural charms."

Derek of EthnoTechno said, "On his third Real World Release all the descriptive words fly out the window, and you're left with an album to dance to, to contemplate, and most of all, to thoroughly enjoy." Qasim Virjee of Indian Electronica rated the album 5/5 and described it as "high degrees of aural texturing".

Track listing

Personnel

Musicians
John Coxon – guitar
Keefe West – guitar, lute (saz)
Niladri Kumar – sitar 
Yazid – woodwind (zorna), oud, banjo

Vocals
Apeksha Dandekar
Elysha West

References

External links

2007 albums
Hindi-language albums
Urdu-language albums
Real World Records albums
Joi (band) albums
Albums produced by Farook Shamsher